Hacha, short for Shenzhen Hacha Industrial Co., Ltd., is a Chinese electronics manufacturer mostly involved with portable media player (PMP) design and manufacture. Its products are sold worldwide and often rebranded under different names.

Founded in 2005, Hacha now has over 300 employees and has released several products including the R280S, PC20, PA20, PC90, and PA70.

Hacha has recently come under some limelight from gadget blogs with its PA20 model which features a 3.2" touch-screen. The PA20 was released during the September 2007.

Another model is the Hacha PC20, that boasts a 3" 16M color widescreen display with dual-chip technology, and was released at the beginning of September 2007.

External links
Hacha Official Website
Hacha Online English Fansite and Worldwide Store

Electronics companies of China
Manufacturing companies based in Shenzhen
Companies established in 2005
Chinese brands